CPI-0610 is a drug which acts as a BET inhibitor, mainly acting at the BRD2 and BRD4 subtypes. It has potential applications in the treatment of various forms of cancer.

References 

Antineoplastic and immunomodulating drugs
Benzazepines